Khalid Hassan may refer to:
 Khaled al-Hassan (1928–1994), Palestinian activist
 Khalid Hasan Shah (1934–1991), Pakistani religious leader
 Khalid Hasan (1934–2009), Pakistani journalist
 Khalid Hasan (cricketer) (1937–2013), Pakistani cricketer
 Khalid Hassan Milu (1960–2005), Bangladeshi singer
 Khaled Abdullah Hassan (born 1966), Bahraini hurdler
 Khalid Hassan (died 2007), Palestinian interpreter and reporter

See also
 Khalid Hussain (disambiguation)